Easterns  (formerly Eastern Transvaal) has played first-class cricket in South Africa since October 1991, and List A cricket since October 1989. For the purposes of the SuperSport Series, Easterns has merged with Northerns (formerly Northern Transvaal) to form the Titans. Eastern Transvaal was spun off from Northern Transvaal at a meeting in Actonville, Benoni. Easterns was called Eastern Transvaal from October 1989 until February 1995, changing its name after the Transvaal became Gauteng and a new province called Eastern Transvaal (later Mpumalanga) was formed that excluded East Rand territories that were part of the Eastern Transvaal cricket team.  It was part of the Titans from October 2004 to April 2021.

Honours
 Currie Cup (1) – 2002–03; shared (0) – 
 Standard Bank Cup (0) – 
 South African Airways Provincial Three-Day Challenge (0) – 
 South African Airways Provincial One-Day Challenge (0) –

Venues
Venues have included:
 PAM Brink Stadium, Springs (Jan 1992 – Jan 1996)
 Olympia Park, Springs (used once Nov 1994; formerly an occasional Northerns venue Dec 1937 – Nov 1994)
 Sahara Park Willowmoore Benoni (main venue Nov 1996 – 2010)

Squad
In April 2021, Cricket South Africa confirmed the following squad ahead of the 2021–22 season.

 Grant Thomson
 Matthew Arnold
 Sizwe Masondo
 Tumelo Simelane
 Jurie Snyman
 Sinenhlanhla Zwane
 Ryan Cartwright
 Wesley Coulentianos
 Clayton August
 Khwezi Gumede

References

Sources
 South African Cricket Annual – various editions
 Wisden Cricketers' Almanack – various editions

South African first-class cricket teams
Cricket in Gauteng
Springs, Gauteng